Ahmed Tawfik (born November 5, 1987) is an Egyptian professional basketball player, currently with Sporting SC of the Egyptian Basketball Super League.

He represented Egypt's national basketball team at the AfroBasket 2015 in Radès, Tunisia.

References

External links
 FIBA profile
 FIBA Archive profile
 Afrobasket.com profile

1987 births
Egyptian men's basketball players
Living people
Point guards
Sportspeople from Alexandria
Place of birth missing (living people)